"I'm Awake Now" is the second single released by the Goo Goo Dolls and featured on the Freddy's Dead: The Final Nightmare Soundtrack.

Like many of the early Goo Goo Doll singles, "I'm Awake Now" was released in a promotional format only.  It was also included on the band's 2008 compilation album, Greatest Hits Vol. 2.

Track listing

 "I'm Awake Now" - 3:16

Music video

A music video was made featuring the band trying to find something to watch on television. They find one of the A Nightmare on Elm Street films on TV and agree to watch that. As they begin to watch it they fall asleep and have a nightmare with Freddy Krueger (Robert Englund) terrorizing them. Several scenes from Freddy's Dead: The Final Nightmare are featured in the video as the band dreams of seeing the film at the theater, being scared and amazed at the same time at the film.

External links
 Music video for I'm Awake Now for the Freddy's Dead: The Final Nightmare soundtrack

1991 singles
Goo Goo Dolls songs
A Nightmare on Elm Street (franchise) music
1991 songs
Warner Records singles
Songs written by John Rzeznik
Songs about nightmares
Songs about Freddy Krueger